Binhaiguojijichang station is the eastern terminus station of Line 2 of the Tianjin Metro. The station serves the Tianjin Binhai International Airport. It started operations on 28 August 2014, along with the new Terminal 2 of the airport.

References

Railway stations in Tianjin
Railway stations in China opened in 2014
Tianjin Metro stations
Airport railway stations in China